Ričmonds Vilde (born July 5, 1990) is a Latvian retired professional basketball player, who played the center/power forward position. Currently, he owns multiple successful businesses in the United States.

He has previously represented Latvia in the U16, U18 and U20 European Championships. After high school Ricmonds Vilde moved to United States and joined SMU to play at NCAA level. During his red shirt year, Vilde started to practice American football and was offered a place in an American football team. Vilde decided to stay with basketball.

In the summer of 2015 for the first time in his career Vilde was included in the Latvian National team's candidate list. However, he was one of the last players who did not make the team for EuroBasket 2015. Later he signed his first pro contract with Latvian champions VEF Rīga.

Ricmonds Vilde's father is a famous Latvian volleyball player Raimonds Vilde who now is the head coach of Latvian Men's Volleyball National Team.

References

External links
 VTB League profile

1990 births
Living people
BK VEF Rīga players
Centers (basketball)
Earth Friends Tokyo Z players
Houston Christian Huskies men's basketball players
Latvian men's basketball players
Latvian expatriate basketball people in the United States
SMU Mustangs men's basketball players
Basketball players from Riga
Lee Academy (Maine) alumni